Chascolytrum is a genus of plants in the grass family, native to Latin America from Mexico to Chile (including the Juan Fernández Islands).

 Species
 Chascolytrum altimontanum Essi, Souza-Chies & Longhi-Wagner - Bolivia
 Chascolytrum ambiguum (Hack.) Essi, Longhi-Wagner & Souza-Chies - southern Brazil 
 Chascolytrum bidentatum (Roseng., B.R.Arrill. & Izag.) Essi, Longhi-Wagner & Souza-Chies - Uruguay, southern Brazil 
 Chascolytrum brachychaetum (Ekman) Essi, Longhi-Wagner & Souza-Chies - southern Brazil 
 Chascolytrum brasiliense (Nees) Essi, Longhi-Wagner & Souza-Chies - southern Brazil 
 Chascolytrum brizoides (Lam.) Essi, Longhi-Wagner & Souza-Chies - Buenos Aires, Uruguay, Rio Grande do Sul, Biobio
 Chascolytrum bulbosum (Parodi) Essi, Longhi-Wagner & Souza-Chies - Uruguay, Brazil 
 Chascolytrum calotheca (Trin.) Essi, Longhi-Wagner & Souza-Chies - Colombia, Brazil , Paraguay, Uruguay, Argentina
 Chascolytrum erectum (Lam.) Desv. - Brazil, Paraguay, Uruguay, Argentina
 Chascolytrum itatiaiae (Ekman) Essi, Longhi-Wagner & Souza-Chies - southern Brazil 
 Chascolytrum juergensii (Hack.) Essi, Souza-Chies & Longhi-Wagner - southern Brazil , Colombia
 Chascolytrum koelerioides (Trin.) Essi, Longhi-Wagner & Souza-Chies - Chile
 Chascolytrum lamarckianum (Nees) Matthei - Brazil , Uruguay, Argentina
 Chascolytrum latifolium Essi, Souza-Chies & Longhi-Wagner - southeastern Brazil 
 Chascolytrum monandrum (Hack.) Essi, Longhi-Wagner & Souza-Chies - Colombia, Ecuador, Peru, Bolivia, Brazil , Argentina
 Chascolytrum paleapiliferum (Parodi) Matthei - northern Argentina
 Chascolytrum parodianum (Roseng., B.R.Arrill. & Izag.) Matthei - southern Brazil , Uruguay
 Chascolytrum poimorphum (J.Presl) Essi, Longhi-Wagner & Souza-Chies - southern Brazil 
 Chascolytrum rhomboideum (Link) Essi, Longhi-Wagner & Souza-Chies - Chile
 Chascolytrum rufum J.Presl in C.B.Presl - Brazil , Paraguay, Uruguay, Argentina; naturalised in New Zealand
 Chascolytrum scabrum (Nees ex Steud.) Matthei - southern Brazil 
 Chascolytrum subaristatum (Lam.) Desv. - Mexico, Guatemala, Colombia, Peru, Bolivia, Chile (including the Juan Fernández Islands), Argentina, Paraguay, southern Brazil, Uruguay; naturalised in Cape Province and in New South Wales
 Chascolytrum uniolae (Nees) Essi, Longhi-Wagner & Souza-Chies - Bolivia, Argentina, Paraguay, southern Brazil , Uruguay; naturalised in Puerto Rico

 formerly included
see Neesiochloa 
 Chascolytrum barbatum - Neesiochloa barbata

See also
 List of Poaceae genera

References

Pooideae
Poaceae genera